Raúl Nicolas Quiroga (born January 26, 1962 in San Juan Province, Argentina) is a retired volleyball player from Argentina, who represented his native country in two Summer Olympics. After having finished in sixth place at the 1984 Summer Olympics in Los Angeles, California he was a member of the men's national team that claimed the bronze medal four years later in Seoul, South Korea.

His nephew Rodrigo Quiroga is current national volleyball team captain. His brother Daniel is also played volleyball and his son Gonzalo plays for national youth team.

References
Profile

1962 births
Living people
Sportspeople from San Juan Province, Argentina
Argentine people of Galician descent
Argentine men's volleyball players
Olympic volleyball players of Argentina
Volleyball players at the 1984 Summer Olympics
Volleyball players at the 1988 Summer Olympics
Olympic bronze medalists for Argentina
Olympic medalists in volleyball
Medalists at the 1988 Summer Olympics
Pan American Games medalists in volleyball
Pan American Games bronze medalists for Argentina
Medalists at the 1983 Pan American Games